Booker T. Washington High School, named for the famous educator, opened in September 1924 under the auspices of the Atlanta Board of Education, with the late Charles Lincoln Harper as principal. It was the first public high school for African-Americans in the state of Georgia and the Atlanta Public Schools system.

Booker T. Washington High School was transformed into four small schools. Starting in the fall of 2014, the school transitioned back to the original one school, with four assistant principals, one academy leader, and one principal.

Administration
 William C Wade, EdS Principal

History

Designed by Atlanta-born architect Eugene C. Wachendorff, the building incorporates medieval and Byzantine elements, including the dramatic main entrance with five arches in two tiers. The building is listed on the National Register of Historic Places.

It is fitting that visitors pass the statue of the school's namesake on the way to the entrance. One of the foremost black educators of the late 19th and early 20th centuries, Booker T. Washington was born into slavery in 1856 on a small farm in Virginia. He founded the Tuskegee Institute in 1881.

In 1927, the only exact replica of the Booker T. Washington monument at Tuskegee University in Alabama was erected at the school's entrance. The statue of Washington, called "Booker T. Washington Lifting the Veil of Ignorance," is a replica of the original bronze at the Tuskegee Institute by sculptor Charles Keck. The inscription reads: "He lifted the veil of ignorance from his people and pointed the way to progress through education and industry."

Today, the school, which was placed on the National Register of Historic Places in 1986, boasts an enrollment of more than 1600 students and a faculty and staff of more than 100.

Visitors to the historic institution have included South African Archbishop Desmond Tutu, activist Jesse Jackson, civil rights pioneer Rosa Parks, and President George W. Bush.

The school serves as a cornerstone of Atlanta Public School's comprehensive reform program, Project GRAD (Graduation Really Achieves Dreams). The project aims to increase the number of inner-city students who graduate and go to college.

Academics

Washington Early College
Booker T. Washington High School-Early College is one of the newest early college small schools in the Atlanta Public School System.  The premise behind the early college concept is to afford students the opportunity to obtain college credits while going to high school.  BTWHS-EC aims to prepare students to pursue post-secondary education at some of the top universities and colleges in the U.S.

In addition to the core program of study, students are required to take the following classes to meet the requirements of the Early College School:
 Early College Seminar
 Early College Math
 Early College English
 Early College Social Studies
 Early College Science

Washington Banking, Finance, and Investment
The Booker T. Washington High School Banking, Finance and Investment Small School (BFI) gives BTW high school students an opportunity to learn about and prepare for college careers in business and finance. Emphasis is placed on a college preparatory curriculum that is directly linked to the business world.

This school prepares students for careers in business and finance with challenging courses. It focuses on broad, transferable skills, with an emphasis on financial industry elements such as accounting, financial planning, management, banking, credit, economics, money management, technology, investments, and insurance. In addition to their required courses, BFI students take one or two specialized courses each semester and a college-level course in their senior year. Students also participate in job shadowing experiences and paid internships.

BFI is a part of the National Academy Foundation's Academy of Finance. This foundation assists in establishing an ongoing relationship that involves corporate executives, school personnel, parents, and students, and results in paid internships, scholarships, and employment opportunities. Students are provided opportunities to enter into paid internships with local financial service companies during the summer of their senior year, and many offers of part-time employment during the school year are provided.  BFI also has the Institute of Student Achievement (ISA) as its intermediary partner. This organization supports the school's planning process, curriculum development, leadership development, and overall development of the small learning communities.

Washington Health, Science, and Nutrition
The Booker T. Washington High School of Health Science and Nutrition (BTWHSN) provides an interdisciplinary curriculum with a health care and nutrition concentration through in-depth investigation, hands-on discovery, experimentation, and inquiry-based learning. Through a four-year program of study, students have the opportunity to:

 Undergo a rigorous and relevant curriculum and receive in-depth instruction designed to ensure that all students meet the graduation requirements of the Atlanta Public Schools system while affording them multiple opportunities for postsecondary study.
 Gain college credit through dual enrollment and advanced placement courses.
 Explore career interest in various nutrition and health care-related fields.
 Gain invaluable knowledge, skills, and experiences through medical seminars, internships, and health science field trips.
 Partake in an array of shadowing opportunities and hands-on modules.

Booker T. Washington High School of Health Science and Nutrition offers two career pathways: Therapeutic Services and Nutrition & Food Science.

Feeder patterns

 Elementary schools: Herndon and Bethune
 Middle schools: Kennedy, Sylvan, and Brown

Local School Council

The property and business of the Booker T. Washington High School Local Council is managed by seven school council members, of whom two are parents or guardians of students enrolled in the school, two are teachers, and two are business education partners. The principal serves as chairperson of the Local School Council, which meets on the first Monday of each month from 9:00-10:00 am in the second-floor conference room at the school.

Student activities

Clubs and organizations

 Academic Enrichment Team
 Band/Auxiliaries
 Bad-To-The-Bone Dance Team
 Beta Club
 Bulldog RAW (Recycling at Washington)
 National Honor Society
 Chess Club
 Chorus
 Dance Ensemble
 Debate Team
 Future Business Leaders of America (FBLA)
 French Club
 Future Educators of America (FEA)
 Glee Club
 Health Occupations Students of America (HOSA)
 Mu Alpha Theta (Mathematics Honor Society)
 Photography/Videography Club
 Spanish Club
 Stock Market
 Student Government Association
 Student Support Team
 Washingtonian newspaper and yearbook team

Athletics

 Football
 Softball
 Baseball
 Track & field
 Cross country
 Cheerleading
 Soccer
 Volleyball
 Golf
 Basketball
 Band
 Swimming
 Tennis

Notable alumni

Religion
 Martin Luther King Jr. - civil rights leader

Arts and entertainment
 Lil Baby - rapper, singer
 Raymond Andrews - novelist
 Bruce Bruce - actor, comedian
 Lee Moses  - musician
 Jean Carne - singer
 Julius "Nipsey" Russell - actor, comedian, dancer
 Ken Sagoes - actor
 Young Thug- rapper, singer
 Lena Horne - actor, singer

Government and politics
 Leroy Johnson - Georgia State Senator 
 Louis Wade Sullivan - former Secretary of Health and Human Services under President George H. W. Bush

Science and medicine
 Asa G. Yancey Sr. - physician associated with Emory University and Grady Hospital

Sports
 Donn Clendenon - former professional baseball player
 Lanard Copeland - Philadelphia 76ers/NBL Australia
 Joe Douse - Negro league baseball player
 Felix Evans - Negro league baseball player
 Reshad Jones - Miami Dolphins (NFL)
 Chico Renfroe - baseball player and sportscaster
 Jabari Smith - Sacramento Kings (NBA)
 Lawrence Smith (American football) - Baltimore Ravens (NFL)
 Elmore Spencer - Los Angeles Clippers (NBA)
 Walter Stith - Buffalo Bills (NFL)
 George "Duke" Robinson - Carolina Panthers (NFL)
 Christopher Phillips - Indiana University (NCAA)

See also
National Register of Historic Places listings in Fulton County, Georgia
List of things named after Booker T. Washington

Footnotes

Further reading

 Jay Winston Driskell, Jr. Schooling Jim Crow: The Fight for Atlanta's Booker T. Washington High School and the Roots of Black Protest Politics. Charlottesville, VA: University of Virginia Press, 2014.

External links

 Washington School of Banking, Finance and Investment
 Booker T. Washington Early College High School
 Booker T. Washington High School of Health Science and Nutrition
 Washington Senior Academy
 Atlanta Public Schools, Office of High Schools

Atlanta Public Schools high schools
Historically segregated African-American schools in Georgia (U.S. state)
School buildings on the National Register of Historic Places in Georgia (U.S. state)
1924 establishments in Georgia (U.S. state)
Educational institutions established in 1924
National Register of Historic Places in Atlanta